The FN 509 is a polymer frame striker-fired semi-automatic pistol manufactured in Columbia, South Carolina, by FN America, a division of FN Herstal. It is chambered in 9×19mm Parabellum featuring double-action operation and a Picatinny rail located forward of the trigger guard. Tactical, midsize, and compact variants have also been made available.

Background
As part of the XM17 Modular Handgun System competition (MHS) initiated in September 2015, FN Herstal entered a polymer-framed, striker-fired pistol, derived from the FN FNS. After SIG Sauer won the competition in January 2017 with a modified version of the P320, FN America brought a version of their entry, now known as the FN 509, to the commercial market. FN sought consultation from retired Delta Force operator Larry Vickers during early development of the FN 509. FN America stated that during development and testing of the MHS entry and the FN 509, over a million rounds of ammunition were used.

Design details

Features
The FN 509 is a striker-fired handgun with a stainless steel slide with ferritic nitrocarburizing finish and a polymer frame. Black and flat dark earth (FDE) colorings are available. The slide has serrations on both front and back, for easy slide manipulation. There is a full-sized grip, housing 17-round magazines; 10-round magazines are available for states with a high-capacity magazine ban. The backstrap of the grip accepts interchangeable inserts; one arched and one flat. Instead of a manual safety, the 509 includes an integrated trigger safety (the articulated trigger type like the FN FNS) as part of its four passive safety systems: a striker block, a drop safety, a trigger disconnect and a trigger safety lever. Magazine releases and slide locks are present on both side of the gun.

Variants
Several variants of the FN 509 have been made available:

 Tactical –  barrel length, 17- and 24-round magazines, available in black or FDE, threaded barrel, raised sights (to accommodate a suppressor), with low-profile optics mounting system (for a red dot sight).
 Midsize –  barrel length, 15-round magazines, available in black, with a midsize frame intended for concealed carry.
 Midsize MRD – as above, with low-profile optics mounting system.
 Compact MRD –  barrel length, 12- and 15-round magazines, available in black or FDE, with low-profile optics mounting system.

Also available are an inert training pistol, and a Simunition (simulated ammunition) pistol.

The subcompact FN 503, introduced in March 2020, uses the "design, performance and reliability standards" of the FN 509.

Specifications

For all variants, 10-round magazines are available for states that restrict capacity.

 For the Tactical variant, 24-round extended magazines also available.

Users

 : Standard-issue sidearm of the Los Angeles Police Department as of 2021.

Notes

References

External links
 
 FN 509 Comparison by Hickok45 via YouTube

9mm Parabellum semi-automatic pistols
FN Herstal firearms
Semi-automatic pistols of the United States
Weapons and ammunition introduced in 2017